The Florida State League (FSL) is a Minor League Baseball league based in the state of Florida. Having been classified at various levels throughout its existence, it operated at Class A-Advanced from 1990 until its demotion to Single-A following Major League Baseball's 2021 reorganization of the minor leagues. The league temporarily operated for the 2021 season as the Low-A Southeast before reassuming its original moniker in 2022.

Each league member is affiliated with a Major League Baseball (MLB) team, and most play in their affiliate's spring training facility.

History
The league originated in 1919 with teams in Bartow, Bradenton, Lakeland, Orlando, Sanford, and Tampa, Florida. The league closed down in 1928 and resumed play in 1936. It has continued uninterrupted, except for a four-year (1942–1945) suspension during World War II.

Initially, the FSL was classified as a Class D circuit. It was elevated to Class C from 1921 to 1924 before reverting to Class D from 1925 to 1928. The league went dormant from 1929 to 1935, but was revived as a Class D circuit from 1936 to 1941. After another period of inactivity from 1942 to 1945, it continued at Class D from 1946 to 1962. When the minor leagues were reconfigured in 1963, the FSL was reclassified as a Class A league. There it continued until the next reorganization in 1990 when it was elevated to Class A-Advanced. 

The championship series' first cancellation was in 2001, when playoffs were canceled after the September 11 attacks. Afterwards, the 2004 playoffs were canceled due to the threat of Hurricane Ivan. Years later, the 2017 FSL Championship finals were canceled on September 5, due to the threat of Hurricane Irma. The winners of the division series playoff games were named co-champions. This marked the third time since 2000 that the championship series game was canceled. In 2019, the end of the season and playoffs were cancelled due to the threat of Hurricane Dorian.

The start of the 2020 season was postponed due to the COVID-19 pandemic before ultimately being cancelled on June 30. As part of Major League Baseball's 2021 reorganization of the minor leagues, the Florida State League was demoted to Single-A and temporarily renamed the "Low-A Southeast" for the 2021 season. Following MLB's acquisition of the rights to the names of the historical minor leagues, the Low-A Southeast was renamed the Florida State League effective with the 2022 season.

Current teams

Complete teams list

Teams of the early FSL (1919–1928)

 Bartow Polkers
 Bradenton Growers
 Clearwater Pelicans
 Daytona Beach Islanders
 Fort Lauderdale Tarpons
 Fort Myers Palms
 Jacksonville Indians
 Jacksonville Scouts
 Lakeland Highlanders
 Miami Hustlers
 Orlando Bulldogs
 Orlando Caps
 Orlando Colts
 Orlando Tigers
 St. Petersburg Saints
 Sanford Celeryfeds
 Sarasota Gulls
 Sarasota Tarpons
 Tampa Smokers
 West Palm Beach Sheriffs

Teams of the modern FSL (1936–present)

 Baseball City Royals
 Bradenton Marauders
 Brevard County Manatees
 Charlotte Rangers
 Charlotte Stone Crabs
 Clearwater Phillies
 Clearwater Threshers
 Cocoa Astros
 Cocoa Indians
 Daytona Beach Admirals
 Daytona Beach Astros
 Daytona Beach Dodgers
 Daytona Beach Islanders
 Daytona Cubs
 Daytona Tortugas
 Deerfield Beach Sun Sox
 DeLand Red Hats
 DeLand Reds
 DeLand Sun Caps
 Dunedin Blue Jays
 Florida Fire Frogs
 Fort Lauderdale Red Sox
 Fort Lauderdale Yankees
 Fort Myers Mighty Mussels
 Fort Myers Miracle
 Fort Myers Royals
 Gainesville G-Men
 Jacksonville Beach Sea Birds
 Jupiter Hammerheads
 Key West Conchs
 Key West Cubs
 Key West Padres
 Key West Sun Caps
 Kissimmee Cobras
 Lakeland Giants
 Lakeland Indians
 Lakeland Pilots
 Lakeland Flying Tigers
 Lakeland Tigers
 Leesburg Anglers
 Leesburg Athletics
 Leesburg Braves
 Leesburg Dodgers
 Leesburg Gondoliers
 Leesburg Lakers
 Leesburg Orioles
 Leesburg Packers
 Leesburg Pirates
 Miami Marlins
 Miami Miracle
 Miami Orioles
 Ocala Yearlings
 Orlando C.B.s
 Orlando Dodgers
 Orlando Flyers
 Orlando Gulls
 Orlando Rays
 Orlando Senators
 Orlando Seratomas
 Orlando Twins
 Osceola Astros
 Palatka Azaleas
 Palatka Cubs
 Palatka Redlegs
 Palatka Tigers
 Palm Beach Cardinals
 Pompano Beach Cubs
 Pompano Beach Mets
 St. Augustine Saints
 St. Lucie Mets
 St. Petersburg Cardinals
 St. Petersburg Devil Rays
 St. Petersburg Saints
 Sanford Cardinals
 Sanford Celeryfeds
 Sanford Giants
 Sanford Greyhounds
 Sanford Lookouts
 Sanford Seminole Blues
 Sanford Seminoles
 Sarasota Reds
 Sarasota Red Sox
 Sarasota Sun Sox
 Sarasota White Sox
 Tampa Tarpons (1957–1988)
 Tampa Tarpons
 Tampa White Sox
 Tampa Yankees
 Vero Beach Dodgers
 Vero Beach Devil Rays
 West Palm Beach Braves
 West Palm Beach Expos
 West Palm Beach Indians
 West Palm Beach Sun Chiefs
 Winter Haven Mets
 Winter Haven Red Sox
 Winter Haven Sun Sox

League timeline

Past champions

Awards
 Florida State League Most Valuable Player Award (formerly the Player of the Year Award)
 Florida State League Pitcher of the Year Award
 Florida State League Manager of the Year Award

Florida State League Hall of Fame
The Florida State League Hall of Fame began in 2009.

See also
Baseball awards#Florida State League

References

External links

 

 
Minor baseball leagues in the United States
Baseball leagues in Florida
Sports leagues established in 1919
1919 establishments in Florida
Professional sports leagues in the United States